The 2026 New York gubernatorial election will take place on November 3, 2026, to elect the Governor of New York. Incumbent Democratic Governor Kathy Hochul took office on August 24, 2021, upon the resignation of Andrew Cuomo, and was elected to a full term at her own right in 2022 with 53.2% of the vote, the closest New York gubernatorial election since 1994 New York gubernatorial election.

Democratic primary

Candidates

Potential
Kathy Hochul, incumbent Governor of New York (2021–present)

Republican primary

Candidates

Publicly expressed interest

General election

References

New York (state) gubernatorial elections
Gubernatorial
New York